Norichio Nieveld (born 25 April 1989) is a Dutch footballer who plays as a centre back for Kozakken Boys in the Dutch Tweede Divisie.

He formerly played for Feyenoord, Excelsior, PEC Zwolle, FC Eindhoven and Go Ahead Eagles. He is also a former Netherlands youth international, gaining 29 caps at different age levels.

Club career
Born in Den Bosch, and playing youth football at OSC '45, FC Den Bosch and Feyenoord, Nieveld made his senior debut for Feyenoord during the 2008–09 season, before moving to Excelsior a season later.

In the summer of 2012 Nieveld moved to PEC Zwolle after being a fee agent. He was signed after playing with Team VVCS, which consists of unemployed football players. On 14 July 2013, he signed with Eindhoven, who had just appointed Jean-Paul de Jong as new head coach. After two seasons with Eindhoven, Go Ahead Eagles picked him up on a free transfer. After two years in Deventer, Nieveld was once left to look for a new club. At the end of July 2017, the clubless defender was on trial at VVV-Venlo, but he did declined a contract not wanting to serve as a backup behind Nils Röseler and Jerold Promes. In January 2018, Nieveld continued his career at FC Oss.

In February 2019, it was announced that Nieveld had signed with Kozakken Boys in the Tweede Divisie.

International career
Nieveld is of Surinamese descent, and has represented the unofficial Suriname national football team in a friendly 1–1 tie with Trinidad and Tobago Pro League champions W Connection in 2014. He is also a former Netherlands youth international.

Personal life
Nieveld began studying law at the Open University of the Netherlands during the later part of his football career.

References

1989 births
Living people
Dutch footballers
Surinamese footballers
Dutch sportspeople of Surinamese descent
Sportspeople from 's-Hertogenbosch
Footballers from North Brabant
Feyenoord players
Excelsior Rotterdam players
PEC Zwolle players
FC Eindhoven players
Go Ahead Eagles players
TOP Oss players
Kozakken Boys players
Eredivisie players
Eerste Divisie players
Tweede Divisie players
Association football central defenders
Netherlands youth international footballers